Newcastle Falcons is a NBL1 East club based in Newcastle, New South Wales. The club fields a team in both the Men's and Women's NBL1 East. The club is a division of Newcastle Basketball, the major administrative basketball organisation in the region. The Falcons play their home games at Broadmeadow Basketball Stadium.

Club history
In 1983, Newcastle Basketball began fielding a men's team in the South Eastern Basketball League (SEBL). The Newcastle Hunters were SEBL champions in 1986 and runners-up in 1987.

The SEBL became known as the SEABL in 1988 and in 1990, Newcastle Basketball entered a team in the inaugural SEABL women's competition. The women's team was originally known as the Newcastle Scorpions. Both the men's team and women's team left the SEABL following the 1998 season.

In 2000, the Hunters men won the Basketball NSW Premier League. The following year, the Premier Division was renamed the Waratah League, with the league joining the Australian Basketball Association (ABA). The Hunters men were Waratah League runners-up in 2004, 2005, 2008 and 2011.

In 2016, the Hunters women were crowned Waratah League champions for the first time. In 2018, the men won their first championship since 2000. In 2019, the women won their second championship in four seasons. The 2021 women's championship was shared by the Hunters and the Sutherland Sharks after the season was cut short in August due to lockdowns as a result of the COVID-19 pandemic.

In late 2021, following the club's admission to the new NBL1 East competition replacing the Waratah League, Newcastle Basketball surveyed the local community to gauge support for a potential rebranding of the club. The club was subsequently renamed the Newcastle Falcons (after the defunct national league NBL franchise of the same name) after 51% of the survey's respondents voted for the change of name.

References

External links
Newcastle Basketball's official website

Waratah League teams
Basketball teams established in 1983
1983 establishments in Australia
Sports teams in Newcastle, New South Wales
Basketball teams in New South Wales
Newcastle, New South Wales